The Ministry of Internal Affairs of Belarus, abbreviated МUS in Belarusian and MVD in Russian, is a body of the Belarusian Government that is charged with the internal affairs of Belarus. Day to day law enforcement is carried out by the Militsiya. The Ministry is also tasked with providing security to state buildings and officials. Organizations such as the Presidential Guard are under the control of the Ministry. The clearing of landmines is among the tasks of the ministry.

History

The MVD/MUS has previously operated under the following names:

NKVD of the Belarusian SSR (1933–1946)
Ministry of Security of the Belarusian SSR (1946–1962)
Ministry of Internal Affairs of the Belarusian SSR (1962–1991)
Ministry of Internal Affairs of the Republic of Belarus (1991–present)

Role in political repressions

According to human rights groups, the United States, and the European Union, the Ministry of Internal Affairs and its senior leadership play a key role in human rights violations and political repressions in Belarus.

A number of former Ministers and senior officials of the Ministry of Internal Affairs, including commanders and officers of the police (Militsiya) and of special police units operated by the Ministry (OMON, Almaz) have been included in the sanctions lists of the European Union and the United States.

Several former officers of the Ministry of Internal Affairs are being accused of involvement in unresolved disappearances and allegedly murder of opposition leaders Yuri Zakharenko (also former Minister of Internal Affairs himself) and Viktor Gonchar, opposition sponsor Anatoly  Krasovski, and journalist Dmitri Zavadski in 1999–2000.

Sanctioned officials of the Ministry of Internal Affairs of Belarus

Structure

Its law enforcement central agency, the Militsiya, is considered to be the main policing and law enforcement agency in Belarus, consisting of services such as:

 Criminal Police
 Central Department of Criminal Investigation
 Central Department for Combatting Economic Crimes
 Department for Drug Control and Trafficking in Human Beings Combatting
 Bureau of Day-to-Day Information Service
 Public Security Police
 Central Department for Law and Order Ensuring and Prevention of Crimes
 Department of State Traffic Police
 Department of Daily On-Duty Service
 AMAP/OMON
 Minister's Personnel
 Official representatives of the MIA
 Central Personnel Department
 Central Department of Ideological Work
 Central Department of Internal Security
 Central Department of Controlling and Auditing
 Main Directorate for Combatting Organized Crime and Corruption
 Headquarters
 International Cooperation Department
 Department of State Secrets Protection
 Bureau of Preparedness Activity and Area Defense
 Department of Day-to-Day Investigation Activity
 Department of Citizenship and Migration
 Department for Execution of Judgments
 Department of Finance and Logistics
 Internal Troops
 Department of Security
 Interpol National Central Bureau of Belarus
 Department of Information and Public Relations
 Department of High-Tech Crimes Detection (Department "K")
 Department of Supervision Activities
 Regional affiliates
 Minsk City Police Department
 Brest City Police Department
 Gomel City Police Department
 Mogilev City Police Department
 Vitebsk City Police Department
 Educational Institutions
 Academy of the Ministry of Internal Affairs
 Mogilev Institute of the Ministry of Internal Affairs
 Centre for Professional Development of Executives and Specialists of the Ministry of Internal Affairs
 Faculty of Interior Troops of the Military Academy of Belarus
 Minsk City Cadet College No. 1

Internal Troops

The Internal Troops (Унутраныя войскі) are a uniformed paramilitary gendarmerie force of Belarus. They were formed from the former Soviet Internal Troops following the collapse of the Soviet Union and consist of three independent brigades and seven independent battalions, totaling round 12,000 personnel. The Internal Troops are regulated by Law No. 2341-XII, signed on 3 June 1993.

Among the Internal Troop formations is the Minsk-based 3rd Red Banner Separate Special-Purpose Brigade (Military 3214, nicknamed the "Uruchenskaya Brigade"). Formed in the 1990s on the basis of the 334th Regiment of the 120th Guards Motor Rifle Division, this specific brigade performs crowd control and anti-terrorism tasks, as well as provides assistance to border guards. In addition, the brigade also trains for combined arms operations in the event an armed conflict arises.

Militsiya
Following the example of the Soviet Militsiya, the Militsiya of the Republic of Belarus is the primary law enforcement agency in Belarus and is responsible for regular policing duties in the country.

Cultural organizations of the MUS

The ) is an official ministerial and cultural institution of the Ministry of Internal Affairs. It was opened on 24 October 1986 as an exhibition devoted to the history of law enforcement agencies on the territory of modern Belarus of the Grand Duchy of Lithuania to present. It underwent a major restoration in the beginning of September 2005.
Na Strazhe, which translates to On Guard in English is a departmental newspaper of the Ministry of Internal Affairs. The signature of all police officers on the newspaper is mandatory. The newspaper was published intermittently from 1942–1944. and from 1970–1977. From 1945, it began to be published under the Russian name On guard of October. Since 3 July 1992 it has been published under the title On guard.

Band Service and Exemplary Band 
The Exemplary Band of the Ministry of Internal Affairs was founded on 20 July 1945 as a military band of the 21st Motorized Rifle Detachment of the Ministry of State Security. Known informally as the Belpolk Band, it was considered to be one of the more prestigious of its kind and often won contests of military bands. On 28 April 1995, the band was re-branded as its current name. Colonel Nikolai Zharko became the first artistic director and chief conductor of the band. Its first concert took place on the first Day of the Militia parade on 4 March 1995 at October Square. It often is notably present as part of a joint band of the Minsk Garrison during the Minsk Independence Day Parade. It is also part of the Military Band Service of Internal Troops of Belarus. The band is currently led by Lieutenant Colonel Alexander Kalinin while the service is led by Lieutenant Colonel Sergei Solodukhin.

Interior Ministers
Uladzimir Yahorau (1990–1994)
Yury Zakharanka (1994–1995)
Valyantsin Ahalets (1995–1999)
Yuri Sivakov (1999–2000)
Uladzimir Navumau (2000–2009)
Anatoly Kuleshov (2009–2012)
Igor Shunyevich (2012–2019)
Yury Karayeu (2019-2020)
Ivan Kubrakov (since 2020)

See also 
Government of Belarus
Law enforcement in Belarus
Minsk City Police Department

References

External links

Politics of Belarus
Law enforcement agencies of Belarus
Internal Affairs
Belarus